Daphnephila is a genus of gall midge that appears in the Palearctic and Oriental biogeographic realms. Daphnephila species create leaf and stem galls on species of laurel plants, particularly in Machilus. Based on analysis on sequences of the mitochondrial cytochrome c oxidase subunit I, it has been suggested that in this genus, the stem-galling habit is a more ancestral state as opposed to the leaf-galling habit.

Daphnephila was first described in 1905 by French entomologist Jean-Jacques Kieffer. It contains at least nine described species from India, Japan, and Taiwan, and many more undescribed species are known. The genus appears to have originated tropically and dispersed to Japan through Taiwan.

References

Bibliography

Further reading 
 Pan, Liang-Yu, et al. "Is a Gall an Extended Phenotype of the Inducing Insect? A Comparative Study of Selected Morphological and Physiological Traits of Leaf and Stem Galls on Machilus thunbergii (Lauraceae) Induced by Five Species of Daphnephila (Diptera: Cecidomyiidae) in Northeastern Taiwan."Zoological Science 32.3 (2015): 314-321.
 Chiang, Tung-Chyuan, and 江東權. "Biosystematics of the galling midge Daphnephila (Diptera: Cecidomyiidae) on Machilus spp.(Lauraceae) in Taiwan." (2012).
 Chao, Jo-Fan, and Gwo-Ing Liao. "Histocytological aspects of four types of ambrosia galls on Machilus zuihoensis Hayata (Lauraceae)." Flora-Morphology, Distribution, Functional Ecology of Plants 208.3 (2013): 157–164.

Diptera of Asia
Taxa named by Jean-Jacques Kieffer
Taxa described in 1905
Cecidomyiinae
Nematocera genera